Shawn Mendes: In Wonder is a 2020 American documentary film directed by Grant Singer. The film centers around singer-songwriter Shawn Mendes and depicts his everyday and on-stage life, as well as his battle against depression and anxiety.

The film premiered at the 2020 Toronto International Film Festival in advance of its release on November 23, 2020, by Netflix, and serves as a prelude to his fourth studio album, Wonder (2020).

Premise 
A portrait of the singer-songwriter's life, chronicling the past few years of his rise and journey.

Cast 

 Shawn Mendes
 Camila Cabello
 Aaliyah Mendes
 Karen Rayment
 Manuel Mendes
 Cez Darke
 Andrew Gertler

Release 
The film was released on November 23, 2020.

Reception 
IndieWire's Ryan Lattanzio scored the film a C, and said "It's a pity that the documentary vehicle that surrounds him isn't more forthcoming about the man beneath the wife beaters and airtight skinny jeans who sends so many swooning, but surely must, at times, feel lonely late at night like the rest of us." Robyn Bahr of The Hollywood Reporter negatively reviewed the film, stating "When it was done, I wasn't sure I had watched anything at all". Several critics compared the film to Taylor Swift's 2020 Netflix documentary, Miss Americana, with many commenting that In Wonder tried to walk in its footsteps, but did not display the turbulence of fame, emotional turmoil, and revelation of Miss Americana.

References

External links 

 

2020 documentary films
2020 films
Documentary films about singers
Netflix original documentary films
Shawn Mendes
2020s English-language films